Lt. Gen. (R) Syed Tanveer Hussain Naqvi is a retired three-star general of Pakistan Army. A close aide of Pervez Musharraf, he was the former head of National Reconstruction Bureau of Pakistan.

References

Pakistani generals
Living people
Year of birth missing (living people)
Place of birth missing (living people)